"Are You Lonely for Me" is an R&B song by group the Rude Boys. Released as a single, the song spent one week at number one on the US R&B chart. "Are You Lonely for Me" was the group's second number-one single.

See also
List of number-one R&B singles of 1991 (U.S.)

References

1990 songs
1991 singles
The Rude Boys songs
Atlantic Records singles